Kleitos is a village and a community of the Kozani municipality. Before the 2011 local government reform it was part of the municipality of Ellispontos, of which it was a municipal district. The 2011 census recorded 408 inhabitants in the village. The community of Kleitos covers an area of 24.048 km2.

History
Kleitos settlement has been relocated to the current location due to the lignite mines' of the Public Power Corporation of Greece expansion towards the original settlement. The original settlement was located 3 km west of Akrini.

See also
List of settlements in the Kozani regional unit

References

Populated places in Kozani (regional unit)